Grup Feroviar Român, or simply GFR, is the largest private railway company in Romania and one of the largest in South Eastern Europe. Founded in 2001, the company owns freight operations in Romania, Hungary, Bulgaria, Greece, Serbia, Ukraine, Moldova, Montenegro and Mozambique, and railcar production and maintenance operations in Romania, Hungary, Serbia and Ukraine. In 2010 GFR operates a park of over 13,500 railroad cars and 285 diesel and electric locomotives.

In 2013, GFR bought a 51% stake in CFR Marfă, which was the freight division of Căile Ferate Române. This purchase cost €202 million.

Equipment

Railroad cars

tank ( for gas, Diesel fuel-oil, black oil, raw oil);
tank ( liquid chemicals, etc.);
platform ;
open (Eacs, Eaos);
specialized for coal (series F);
specialized for cereals transportation (series U);
specialized for the transport of bulk chemical fertilizers (series T);
specialized for the transport of assemblies (series Eakkmos).

Electric locomotives
Co'Co' ex-CFR Class 40
Bo'Bo' ex-CFR Class 43
Bo'Bo' ex-SNCF Class BB 25100/25150/25200

Diesel–electric locomotives (LDE)
Co'Co' ex-CFR Class 60/62 2,100 hp
1,300 hp
1,250 hp

Diesel-hydraulic locomotives (LDH)
1,250 hp
700 hp
450 hp

Other
In July 2007 GFR offered a bid for Hungarian company MÁV Cargo of around US$300 million and thus qualified for the final price offering for the company, from third place just behind Slovak company Speed Trans Consortium and a Cyprus based fund.
Control of Bulgarian Railway Company A.D. is shared by five Bulgarian companies and one Romanian company, Grup Feroviar Roman Bucharest.
The company also bought in 2006 the largest Serbian wagon construction and maintenance company, Zelvoz Smederevo.

See also
Remar Paşcani

References

External links
Official site

Railway companies of Romania
Companies based in Bucharest